WTF most often refers to:
WTF (Internet slang), an expression of disbelief

WTF may also refer to:

Arts and entertainment

Books and online publications
The Daily WTF, a blog about information technology "perversions"
WTF? What's the Future and Why It's Up to Us, a book by Tim O'Reilly, 2017
WTF? (book), a book by the British journalist Robert Peston, 2017

Film, radio, TV and videogames
Weird, True & Freaky, a documentary series on Animal Planet
Work Time Fun, a video game for the PlayStation Portable
"WTF", a segment on sexual fetishes on G4TV's Attack of the Show
WTF! (2017 film), a 2017 US horror film
"W.T.F." (South Park), (Wrestling Takedown Federation), the 191st episode of South Park
WTF (TV channel), the former name of the British music television channel, now 90s
WTF with Marc Maron, a podcast hosted by comedian Marc Maron
WXTF-LP (WTF Radio), an American low-power non-profit community radio station in Harrisville, Michigan

Music 
WTF?, an electronic music supergroup comprising deadmau5, Tommy Lee, Steve Duda, and DJ Aero

Albums
W.T.F. (Wisdom, Tenacity and Focus), by rapper Vanilla Ice, 2011
WTF?!, by industrial band KMFDM, 2011

Songs
"WTF (Where They From)", by Missy Elliott and Pharrell, 2015
"WTF?" (song), by OK GO, 2010
"WTF", by Heart from Red Velvet Car, 2010
"WTF", by Wiz Khalifa from Cabin Fever, 2011

Theatre
 World Theatre Festival (disambiguation), various festivals
 Williamstown Theatre Festival, Massachusetts, US

Organisations
 Western Task Force, in World War II's Operation Torch
 Wikileaks Task Force, of the US CIA
 World Taekwondo, previously known as the World Taekwondo Federation (WTF)

Other initialisms and codes
 ATP World Tour Finals (ATP WTF)
 Wobbly Transformation Format – 8-bit, an extension of UTF-8
 .wtf, an Internet top-level domain
 wtf, language code for the Watiwa language, a Trans–New Guinean language
 "WTF star" ("Where's The Flux"), or KIC  8462852, an unusual star

See also 
 
 
 What the fuck (disambiguation)
 Whiskey tango foxtrot (disambiguation)
 WT1190F, a large piece of space debris that came down to Earth on November 13, 2015
 WTFPL, Do What the Fuck You Want To Public License, a permissive software license